Conrad Borg Manché is a Maltese politician, serving as the Mayor of Gżira, Malta, on behalf of the Labour Party. 
He was brought up in Gzira.
As a political activist, he gained fame in Malta for re-opening access to the coast of Manoel Island for the public in September, 2016, after it was closed for over 15 years due to the developments by MIDI.

The popular support gained by Borg Manché led to the first environmental guardianship agreement of its kind to be signed in Malta, safeguarding the future of Manoel Island and its surrounding environment of Gżira, Sliema and Valletta.

As a result of his actions the Manoel Island Foundation was founded to serve as the guardian of the Manoel Island Project. The Guardianship agreement ensures unencumbered public access to the Manoel Island foreshore, Fort Manoel, to be utilised for cultural, community and commercial uses enjoyed by the general public, secures protected swimming zones, building heights limited to four floors and a new park of over 80,000 m2 will be restored and returned to the public, something hailed as "a model for the relationship between the community and the investor" by Maltese prime minister Joseph Muscat. The Manoel island Foundation is composed by Borg Manché as chairman, and members Claire Bonello, Ralph Mangion and  Midi CEO Mark Portelli.

Borg Manché was elected as mayor on his first electoral contestation of the 7th legislature of the Gżira Local Council held in 2015. In June 2019, he was re-elected mayor thereby making him the first mayor of Gżira to be re-elected for the second consecutive term and obtaining a record majority of 60%.

Borg Manché is known to be one of the foremost supporters of sustainable development in Malta, protesting against excessive planned skyscraper development in Gzira and ensuring that environmental factors like air quality are monitored properly to safeguard the quality of life for citizens of the locality.

References

Living people
University of Malta alumni
Labour Party (Malta) politicians
People from Pietà, Malta
Mayors of places in Malta
21st-century Maltese politicians
1980 births